Jane de Souza Borges Oliveira (born c. 1985) is a Brazilian beauty queen who represented Brazil in Miss World 2006 in Poland, placing as one of the Top 6 finalists and obtaining the title of Miss World Americas.

Early life
Prior to competing in Miss World 2006, Borges completed an internship at a social security office and intended to pursue a career in psychology.

Miss World 2006
As the official representative of her country to the 2006 Miss World pageant held in Warsaw, Poland, Borges became one of the Top 25 semifinalists during the Miss World Beach Beauty fast track event, finishing her participation as one of the Top 6 finalists of Miss World 2006 and obtaining the title of Miss World Americas.

Reina Hispanoamericana 2007 
On October 26, 2007, she participated in Reina Hispanoamericana 2007 and placed first runner-up to  Massiel Taveras of the Dominican Republic.

References

Miss World 2006 delegates
1980s births
Living people
Brazilian beauty pageant winners